Desafío Español 2007 is a yacht racing team that competed for the Louis Vuitton Cup 2007, the challenger series held prior to the America's Cup. They made the Semi Finals before being eliminated by Team New Zealand.

John Cutler was the teams tactician and technical director.
Official Website (defunct)

America's Cup teams
2004 establishments in Spain